The Four Lakes are a chain of four small glacial Paternoster lakes in Custer County, Idaho, United States, located in the White Cloud Mountains in the Sawtooth National Recreation Area.  The lakes are located in the upper portion of the Little Boulder Creek watershed upstream of Quiet Lake and east of Patterson Peak.  No trails lead to the Four Lakes Basin.

References

See also

 List of lakes of the White Cloud Mountains
 Sawtooth National Forest
 Sawtooth National Recreation Area
 White Cloud Mountains

Lakes of Idaho
Lakes of Custer County, Idaho
Glacial lakes of the United States
Glacial lakes of the Sawtooth National Forest